Troy Williamson (born 22 August 1991) is an English professional boxer who has held the IBF European junior-middleweight title since 2019. As an amateur he won the 2015 ABA Championships in the middleweight division.

Early life and amateur career
Troy Williamson was born on 22 August 1991 in Darlington, England. The fourth youngest of 11 children, he first began boxing at the age of 10. As the age for participating in competitive fights is 11, he quickly became bored of the training regime and walked away from the sport. He regained interest at the age of 17, going on to compile a record of 68–15. During his amateur career he reached the finals of two ABA Championships; losing against Anthony Fowler at the 2014 edition and winning the competition the following year. He also represented England at the 2015 European Championships, losing in the quarter-finals, and competed at the 2015 and 2016 World Series of Boxing as part of the British Lionhearts.

Professional career
Williamson made his professional debut on 29 October 2016, scoring a third-round knockout (KO) victory over Borislav Zankov at the Meadowbank Sports Centre in Edinburgh, Scotland. After compiling a record of 12–0–1 (9 KOs) he faced Dario Socci for the vacant IBF European junior-middleweight title on 21 December 2019 at the Copper Box Arena in London. Williamson captured his first professional title by defeating Socci via technical knockout (TKO) in the tenth and final round.

Professional boxing record

References

English male boxers
Sportspeople from Darlington
Light-middleweight boxers
Middleweight boxers
Living people
1991 births